Kishore Kunal (born 1950) is a former officer of the Indian Police Service from the state of Bihar, India.  During his police career, he was appointed as the Officer on Special Duty (Ayodhya) by the prime minister V. P. Singh to mediate between the Vishwa Hindu Parishad and the Babri Masjid Action Committee on the Ayodhya dispute. He continued to serve in this position during the premierships of Chandra Sekhar and P. V. Narasimha Rao.

Early life
Kishore Kunal was born in a bhumihar family on 10 August 1950. He had his schooling at Baruraj village in Muzaffarpur district. Then he studied History and Sanskrit at Patna University, graduating in 1970. Later, in the middle of his career, he also studied for master's degree, receiving it in 1983. His teachers included historians R. S. Sharma and D. N. Jha.

Career
In 1972, Kunal became an officer of the Indian Police Service in the Gujarat cadre. His first posting was as the Superintendent of Police, at Anand. By 1978, he rose to become the Deputy Commissioner of Police of Ahmedabad.

After completion of his Master's in 1983, Kunal was appointed as the Senior Superintendent of Police at Patna. In 2001, Kunal resigned from the Indian Police Service voluntarily. After retirement, he served as the chairman of the Bihar State Board of Religious Trusts. Kunal is also secretary of the Mahavir Temple Trust, Patna, and previously of Mahavir Arogya Sansthan, in which he was involved with the improvement of healthcare for the poor. He also founded Gyan Niketan school in Patna.

Ayodhya dispute 
The Government of V. P. Singh established an 'Ayodhya Cell' in 1990 under the leadership of the Minister of State for Home Affairs for handling the Ayodhya dispute. Kunal was appointed as an 'Officer on Special Duty' to assist in its functioning. The cell continued under the Government of Chandra Sekhar (November 1990–March 1991), during which time Rajiv Gandhi suggested that historical and archaeological evidence should be taken into consideration for deciding the Ayodhya issue. The representatives of the Vishva Hindu Parishad (VHP) and the Babri Masjid Action Committee (BMAC) met under the banner of the Ayodhya Cell, and decided to exchange their respective evidence. Kunal stated that he had forwarded the submitted evidence to the Chairman of the Indian Council of Historical Research (ICHR), the Director General of the Archaeological Survey of India (ASI) and the Director General of Archives for verification and submitting reports. Both VHP and BMAC had also nominated ten experts each to examine the evidence. The four key historians nominated by the BMAC, R. S. Sharma, Suraj Bhan, M. Athar Ali and D. N. Jha, asked for six weeks to examine the VHP's evidence. The VHP did not agree to the demand. The negotiations ended after this.

Kunal later published his own analysis of the evidence submitted by the parties, and other evidence that he unearthed on his own, under the title Ayodhya Revisited.

Social service

Mahavir Temple
Kunal is also secretary of the Mahavir mandir, Patna. Under his secretaryship, renovation work of Mahavir Temple started on 30 October 1983, and it was inaugurated on 4 March 1985. Governor R S Gavai on Monday said Mahavir Temple is an ideal religious trust and it should be emulated by other trusts in the country. Mahavir Trust later set up Mahavir Cancer Sansthan. The Samiti also runs another hospital, Mahavir Arogya Sansthan, at Kankerbagh, and on its premises Mahavir Netralaya has been set up which caters to the needs of those suffering from eye problems. The temple has already established four big hospitals and provides financial help to the needy people.

Mundeshwari Bhawani Mandir
He is involved in the uplift of Mundeshwari Bhawani Mandir, the 'oldest' surviving temple in the eastern region belonging to Gupta Age (AD 343) and located in Kaimur hills. The temple site will also be developed into a full-fledged pilgrim center, just like Vaishno Devi temple, with a number of amenities like dormitory, rest rooms, kitchens and efficient transportation system. As part of the temple's development plans, a 'vivah' mandap is under construction in over two-and-a-half acres.< He is penning a historical novel titled 'Mahima Mundeshwari Maa Ki'. Recently, a 185-page book 'Mundeshwari Mandir: The Oldest Recorded Temple in the Country', also written by him, was released.

Virat Ramayan Temple

Under his leadership as the Secretary, Bihar Mahavir Mandir Trust (BMMT), he has spearheaded building the biggest temple in the world. He said, "they will build a bigger temple in Bihar's East champaran district than the 12th century Angkor Wat temple in Cambodia."

Awards 
In 2008 he received the Bhagwaan Mahaveer Award for his contribution to community and social services. The award, presented to Kunal by the President of India Pratibha Patil, is instituted by the Bhagwan Mahaveer Foundation, Chennai. Acharya Kunal is the first individual from Bihar-Jharkhand to get this award. His selection was made by a jury headed by Justice Shri M. N. Venkatachaliah, former Chief Justice of India.

Works
 Ayodhya Revisited (Prabhat Prakashan, 2016). .

In this 800-page book, Kunal has analysed the historical documents to draw the conclusion that the Babri Masjid was built by Emperor Aurangzeb, not Babur. He blames the British East India Company surveyor Francis Buchanan for erroneously crediting Babur. Kunal also states that a Ram temple existed at the disputed site which was demolished by Aurangzeb's governor Fedai Khan in 1660 AD. Reviewer Kuldeep Kumar has remarked that the book deserves a close reading by professional historians.

In May 2017, Kunal indicated that he would submit a petition to the Supreme Court of India in Ayodhya dispute presenting his evidence and analysis and "become a party to the dispute".

References

Bibliography
 
 
 

Living people
Writers from Patna
Indian Sanskrit scholars
Hindu writers
Indian social reformers
Indian police officers
Analysts of Ayodhya dispute
Scholars from Bihar
1950 births